Boithang Haokip (born 9 September 1991) is an Indian footballer who currently plays for SC East Bengal in the Indian Super League. A free-kick specialist, he primarily plays as a central midfielder but can play as a full-back or a wide player.

Career

Shillong Lajong
Boithang started his career at Shillong Lajong's academy and made his senior professional debut during the 2009-10 I-League season, scoring twice, while at the same time, actively playing for Lajong's youth team. With his team relegated at the end of the season, Boithang continued with the youth team while participating in the 2011 I-League 2nd Division. Lajong finished the final round at the top of the table and hence gaining promotion to the 2011-12 I-League.

Boithang's season got off to a good start as he scored for Lajong in the 2011 Federation Cup against Churchill Brothers in the 70th minute on 17 September 2011. He would score his first goal of the 2011-12 season against Chirag United Kerala on 24 March 2012 in a 3-2 loss for his team.

Boithang established himself as a first team regular at Lajong during the 2012-13 I-League season, appearing 22 times and scoring 4 goals. He started the 2013-14 season in the 2013-14 Federation Cup and would score against Mumbai in a 4-0 win for his team. He continued his consistent form during the 2013-14 I-League, appearing 23 times and scoring 5 goals. On 29 April 2014, after the 2013-14 season, Haokip was voted the "Fan's Player of the Season" during the FPAI Indian Football Awards.

Boithang represented NorthEast United FC during the 2014 Indian Super League.

Mumbai City

Bengaluru FC
Haokip was picked by Bengaluru FC on 23 July 2017 in ISL draft.

Career statistics

Club

Honours

Club 
Bengaluru FC
Indian Super League(1): 2018-19

INDIVIDUAL- ILEAGUE Fans player of the year(2013–14).

References

Indian footballers
1991 births
Living people
I-League players
Shillong Lajong FC players
NorthEast United FC players
Bengaluru FC players
East Bengal Club players
Indian Super League players
Footballers from Manipur
People from Senapati district
Association football midfielders